Hot Country Songs is a chart that ranks the top-performing country music songs in the United States, published by Billboard magazine.  In 1972, 27 different singles topped the chart, at the time published under the title Hot Country Singles, in 53 issues of the magazine, based on playlists submitted by country music radio stations and sales reports supplied by stores.

In the first issue of Billboard of the new year, "Kiss an Angel Good Mornin'" by Charley Pride spent its fifth week at number one. The following week, it was displaced by the double A-sided single "Would You Take Another Chance on Me" / "Me and Bobby McGee" by Jerry Lee Lewis. Freddie Hart spent the most weeks at number one in 1972, occupying the top spot for a total of 11 weeks with "My Hang-Up Is You", "Bless Your Heart" and "Got the All Overs for You (All Over Me)". "My Hang-Up Is You" had the longest unbroken run at number one, spending six weeks at the top of the chart in the spring.  This was twice as long as any other song spent at number one during 1972. Hart had been a recording artist since the early 1950s and made his first appearance on the Hot Country chart in 1959, but had never reached the top 10 until 1971, when "Easy Loving" went to number one.  That song began a run of top 10 entries which lasted until 1975, when his chart performance began to decline again. In addition to Hart, Merle Haggard and Pride each achieved three number ones in 1972, spending six and seven weeks respectively at the top of the chart.

Three artists topped the chart for the first time in 1972. Donna Fargo spent three weeks at number one in June with her first chart entry, "The Happiest Girl in the Whole U.S.A.", and went on to gain her second number one in the fall with "Funny Face".  Jerry Wallace achieved his only country chart-topper with "If You Leave Me Tonight I'll Cry", which spent two non-consecutive weeks at number one after being featured in an episode of the television show Night Gallery. Finally, Mel Tillis topped the chart for the first time with "I Ain't Never", more than a decade after he had first charted in Billboard. Tillis co-wrote the song with Webb Pierce, whose version went to number two on the chart in 1959, but Tillis did not record the song himself until 1972, when his version outperformed Pierce's and became his first number one. The final number one of the year was "She's Got to Be a Saint" by another singer who had been charting since the 1950s, Ray Price.

Chart history

a.  Double A-sided single

See also
1972 in music
List of artists who reached number one on the U.S. country chart

References

1972
1972 record charts
Country